Road agent is another name for highwayman. 

Road agent may also refer to:
 Road Agent (1941 film), directed by Charles Lamont
 Road Agent (1952 film), directed by Lesley Selander
 Road Agent (professional wrestling), a professional wrestling liaison between the wrestlers and management
 Road Agent, a bubble topped car created by Ed Roth